Olearia lyallii is a New Zealand plant from the genus Olearia. It is commonly known as the subantarctic tree daisy. The species is endemic to the Snares Islands and southern New Zealand, and has also established itself as an introduced species on the Auckland Islands, whence the type specimen was described. O. lyallii forms trees up to 10 m tall with trunks 50 cm in diameter.

References

Flora of the South Island
lyallii
Trees of New Zealand
Trees of mild maritime climate
Flora of the Auckland Islands
Snares Islands / Tini Heke